David Wolf: Secret Agent is an interactive movie published  by Dynamix in 1989 for MS-DOS.

Several action scenes allow the player to attempt to perform various feats for David Wolf, such as flying a hang glider while shooting down enemies, racing down a highway while dueling with enemy cars and helicopters, or landing on an enemy parachutist or landing on top of a moving truck.

Plot
The protagonist is David Wolf, a secret agent serving an intelligence agency named Peregrine. A criminal organization called Viper has stolen a SF-2a "Shadowcat" stealth fighter and kidnapped its chief designer, Dr. Kelly O'Neill, intending to deliver a nuclear bomb to Washington, D.C.

The first lead is a Monte Carlo casino where O'Neill was spotted with Garth Stock, a pilot who recently defected to Viper. During a failed attempt to rescue O'Neill, David Wolf learns that the Stealth is to be launched from Drax Island, west of Cyprus, and after a long car chase, he escapes by a means of a submarine. On his way to Drax, David Wolf is set up by Stock who rigged his plane, but Wolf escapes by stealing his parachute and lands on a truck driving to the Viper airport base.

Wolf discreetly attempts to reclaim the plane and there he sees O'Neill having escaped. Together they operate the plane against Viper and deliver it to USS Nimitz.

Gameplay
This cinematic game features digitized 3-D graphics. Players cannot select or influence the actors' dialogue, nor select actions for the hero to try to complete. There are only six areas within the game where the player actually can use the keyboard or joystick.  The player uses a VCR interface to set options such as the difficulty of the action sequences, the text speed for the actors, and the detail of the 3d engine. Players can also jump to any of the arcade scenes from the interface.

Reception
Computer Gaming World stated that the game had too few action sequences, and that the initially witty dialogue became inane and unintentionally funny. While approving of the quality of the "visually stunning" digitized footage, it concluded that the game would not be worth playing more than once. The game was reviewed in 1990 in Dragon #154 by Hartley, Patricia, and Kirk Lesser in "The Role of Computers" column. The reviewers gave the game 3 out of 5 stars.

Computer Gaming World included the game in its list of Worst Games of All Time, and Worst Back Story of All Time.

Reviews
The Games Machine - Feb, 1990
ASM (Aktueller Software Markt) - May, 1990

See also
Operation Stealth, contemporaneous game involving a secret agent and a stolen Stealth fighter

References

External links
David Wolf: Secret Agent at MobyGames
David Wolf: Secret Agent at GameFAQs
David Wolf: Secret Agent at GameSpot
David Wolf: Secret Agent review from Compute! (Issue 117 / February 1990 / Page 89)

1989 video games
Aviation fiction
DOS games
DOS-only games
Dynamix games
Fictional secret agents and spies
Interactive movie video games
Single-player video games
Spy video games
Video games set in Cyprus
Video games set in England
Video games set in France
Video games developed in the United States